Salvia mellifera (black sage, also known as seel by the Mahuna) is a small, highly aromatic, evergreen shrub of the genus Salvia (the sages) native to California, and Baja California, Mexico. It is common in the coastal sage scrub of Southern California and northern Baja California. Black sage has a dark appearance, especially during drought.

Description 
It is covered with simple hairs with some glandular hairs, which makes it highly aromatic. The upper surface of the leaf is somewhat glabrous, while the lower surface of the leaf is hairy.

The flowers are usually a pale blue or lavender color, and rarely a pale rose color. The upper lip of the flower is 2-lobed. The style and stamens are slightly exserted. The fruit produced by the black sage is a schizocarp composed of four  brown nutlets.

Ecology 
Black sage grows in the coastal sage scrub and lower chaparral plant communities. It occurs from sea level to  elevation. Black sage is able to grow on a variety of different soils, including sandstone, shale, granite, serpentinite, and gabbro or basalt. It is semi-deciduous, depending on the location and severity of drought, shallow rooted, and drought tolerant by leaf curling rather than drought-avoiding through leaf drop.

Black sage readily hybridizes with three other coastal scrub Salvias: Salvia apiana (white sage), Salvia leucophylla, and Salvia clevelandii. It rarely hybridizes with the annuals Salvia columbariae and Salvia carduacea.

Traditional use
The Chumash people used a strong sun tea of the leaves and stems of the plant. This was rubbed on the painful area or used to soak one's feet. The plant contains diterpenoids, such as aethiopinone and ursolic acid, that are pain relievers.

The Black Sage also produces a nectar that Black Sage honey is made from. This honey is typically peppery and strong, and is prized as a rare honey due to the plant's dry climate. Black Sage honey can only be made when specific rain conditions are met and the plant produces enough nectar.

See also
California chaparral and woodlands

Notes

External links

 
 
 
 Jepson Flora Project – Salvia mellifera
 USDA Forest Service: SPECIES:  Salvia mellifera
 USDA Natural Resources Conservation Treatment: Salvia mellifera

mellifera
Flora of California
Flora of Baja California
Natural history of the California chaparral and woodlands
Natural history of the California Coast Ranges
Natural history of the Channel Islands of California
Natural history of the Peninsular Ranges
Natural history of the San Francisco Bay Area
Natural history of the Santa Monica Mountains
Natural history of the Transverse Ranges
Plants used in traditional Native American medicine
Garden plants of North America
Drought-tolerant plants
Flora without expected TNC conservation status